"Weekend" is a song by American rapper Mac Miller, released as the second single from his third studio album GO:OD AM (2015) on January 12, 2016. The song features American singer Miguel.

Composition
The song finds Mac Miller rapping about what he does over the weekend, while Miguel sings the chorus, expressing relief at the end of the week.

Music video
The music video begins with Mac Miller walking and rapping in a dark alley alone, before Miguel picks him up in a car. They then cruise around and go to a locale where Miller raps in a jungle setting hanging with body-suit clad and face-covered women.

Charts

Certifications

References

2015 songs
2016 singles
Mac Miller songs
Miguel (singer) songs
Songs written by Mac Miller
Songs written by Miguel (singer)
Songs written by FKi 1st
Warner Records singles